Qshell is an optional command-line interpreter (shell) for the IBM i operating system. Qshell is based on POSIX and X/Open standards. It is a Bourne-like shell that also includes features of KornShell. The utilities (or commands) are external programs that provide additional functions. The development team of Qshell had to deal with platform-specific issues such as translating between ASCII and EBCDIC. The shell supports interactive mode as well as batch processing and can run shell scripts from Unix-like operating systems with few or no modifications.

Commands
The following is a list of commands that are supported by the Qshell command-line interpreter on IBM i 7.4.

Differences from other Unix shells
Qshell does not support the  redirection operator or provide a command history. It also has no job control support as IBM i operating system does not have the concept of a foreground or background process group. The POSIX standard  and  built-in commands are therefore not available as well.

Compared to PASE for i
According to IBM, QSHELL is a “Unix-like” interface built over IBM i.  The commands issued by the user point to programs in a “Qshell” library. It began as a port from the ash shell, which was a Bourne-like shell created by Berkeley Software Design.

See also
Control Language
Comparison of command shells

References

Further reading

External links

Exploring iSeries QSHELL

Command shells
Interpreters (computing)
IBM operating systems